Lonicera ciliosa, the orange honeysuckle or western trumpet honeysuckle is a honeysuckle native to forests of western North America. The fruit is a translucent orange-red berry less than  diameter.

Medicinal uses 
During Lewis and Clark's expeditions beginning in 1804, Lonicera conjugialis was one of the many florae recorded. The orange honeysuckle was used as cold medicine, a contraceptive, a sedative and even as a tuberculosis remedy.

Edible uses
The fruits are edible either raw or cooked, but are not a common food.

References

Flora of Idaho
ciliosa
Flora without expected TNC conservation status